Hymenoxys anthemoides, the South American rubberweed, is a South American species of flowering plants in the daisy family. It is native to Bolivia, Paraguay, Uruguay, and Argentina.

References

External links

anthemoides
Flora of South America
Plants described in 1803